Key Performance Parameters (KPPs) specify what the critical performance goals are in a  United States Department of Defense (DoD) acquisition under the JCIDS process.

The mandates require 3 to 8 KPPs be specified for a United States Department of Defense major acquisition, known as Acquisition Category 1 or ACAT-I.

The term is defined as "Performance attributes of a system considered critical to the development of an effective military capability. A KPP normally has a threshold representing the minimum acceptable value achievable at low-to-moderate risk, and an objective, representing the desired operational goal but at higher risk in cost, schedule, and performance. KPPs are contained in the Capability Development Document (CDD) and the Capability Production Document (CPD) and are included verbatim in the Acquisition Program Baseline (APB). KPPs are considered Measures of Performance (MOPs) by the operational test community."

Commentary notes that metrics must be chosen carefully, and that they are hard to define and apply throughout a projects life cycle.  It is also desired that KPPs of a program avoid repetition, and to be something applicable among different programs such as fuel efficiency.   Higher numbers of KPPs are associated to program and schedule instability.

See also 
 Analysis of Alternatives
 Requirement (example mention of Net-Ready KPP, a mandated KPP)

References

External links 
 CJCSI 3170.01H at DAU collection
 CJCSM 3170.01C at everyspec.com

United States Department of Defense
United States defense procurement
Systems engineering